The January 20–22, 2014 North American blizzard was a fast-moving but disruptive blizzard that moved through the Northeast, mainly the Mid-Atlantic states, dumping up to  in areas around the New York City area. The storm also brought cold temperatures behind it, similar to a snowstorm earlier that month. In addition, a NHL game between the Philadelphia Flyers and Carolina Hurricanes was postponed.

Meteorological history 
On January 19, a weak Alberta clipper exited out of Canada, and quickly moved through the Upper Midwest on January 20, dropping little to no accumulations of snowfall. As it moved eastward early on January 21, frontogenesis occurred, and precipitation expanded from Indiana to western Pennsylvania. At the same time though, an upper low was tracking through the area, and this was holding the clipper system along with it. Then, as it neared the coast, a new area of low pressure developed off the Outer Banks and began to move northwards, as snowfall expanded into parts of the Mid-Atlantic, reaching into areas like Connecticut. Most of the precipitation associated with this system was snowfall, due to an ongoing cold wave, which due to this made forecasting very easy. As the new low continued to move northwards, winds began to pick up along the coast, which at times led to blizzard conditions. Snow from the system continued to linger into January 22–23 even as it continued to pull away from the New England coast.

Impact

Snowfall totals 
Below are a list of snowfall totals above 12 inches. Snowfall totals from the lake-effect snow that followed is not included.

Source:

See also 
Early January 2014 nor'easter – the previous winter storm that impacted similar areas.
January 2015 North American blizzard – a stronger blizzard that impacted nearly the same areas with a very similar origin.

References 

2013–14 North American winter
Blizzards in the United States
January 2014 events in North America
2014 natural disasters in the United States
2014 in Pennsylvania
2014 in Indiana
2014 in New York (state)
Natural disasters in Massachusetts